Matt O'Dowd may refer to:

 Matt O'Dowd (astrophysicist) (born 1973), Australian academic and science communicator
 Matt O'Dowd (runner) (born 1976), British Olympic marathon runner